Alexander Markovich Polyakov (born 27 September 1945) is a Russian theoretical physicist, formerly at the Landau Institute in Moscow and, since 1990, at Princeton University, where he is the Joseph Henry Professor of Physics.

Important discoveries
Polyakov is known for a number of fundamental contributions to quantum field theory, including work on what is now called the 't Hooft–Polyakov monopole in non-Abelian gauge theory, independent from Gerard 't Hooft. Polyakov and coauthors discovered the so-called  BPST instanton which, in turn, led to the discovery of the vacuum angle in QCD. His path integral formulation of string theory had profound and lasting impacts on the conceptual and mathematical understanding of the theory. His paper "Infinite conformal symmetry in two-dimensional quantum field theory" written with Alexander Belavin and Alexander Zamolodchikov laid down the foundations of two-dimensional conformal field theory and has classic status. Polyakov also played an important role in elucidating the conceptual framework behind renormalization independent of Kenneth G. Wilson's Nobel Prize–winning work. He formulated pioneering ideas in gauge/string duality long before the breakthrough of AdS/CFT using D-branes. Other insightful conjectures that came years or even decades before active work by others include integrability of gauge and string theories and certain ideas about turbulence.

Very early in his career, in a 1965 student work, Polyakov suggested (with Alexander Migdal) a dynamical Higgs mechanism, slightly after but independently from the publications of Peter Higgs and others. The paper was delayed by the Editorial Office of JETP, and was published only in 1966.

Honors and awards
Alexander Polyakov was awarded the Dirac Medal of the ICTP and the Dannie Heineman Prize for Mathematical Physics in 1986, the Lorentz Medal in 1994, the Oskar Klein Medal in 1996, the Harvey Prize in 2010, the Lars Onsager Prize (together with A. Belavin and A. Zamolodchikov) in 2011 and the Fundamental Physics Prize in 2013. On 19 November 2020 the German Physical Society announced it would award Alexander Polyakov the 2021 Max Planck Medal.

Polyakov was elected to the Soviet Academy of Sciences in 1984, to the French Academy of Sciences in 1998 and the U.S. National Academy of Sciences (NAS) in 2005.

Political positions 
In February-March 2022, he signed an open letter by Russian scientists condemning the 2022 Russian invasion of Ukraine, and another open letter by Breakthrough Prize laureates with the same message.

Famous quotes

“The garbage of the past often becomes the treasure of the present (and vice versa).”
“There are no tables for path integrals.” (quoted in )
“I wanted to learn about elementary particles by studying boiling water.”  (paraphrased in )

See also

 Polyakov action
 't Hooft–Polyakov monopole
 Belavin–Polyakov–Schwarz–Tyupkin instantons
 QCD vacuum
 Conformal bootstrap
 Liouville theory
 AdS/CFT correspondence

References

External links
Dirac Medal 1986 citation
Departmental homepage at Princeton

American string theorists
Soviet physicists
20th-century American physicists
Russian physicists
Moscow Institute of Physics and Technology alumni
Academic staff of the Moscow Institute of Physics and Technology
Princeton University faculty
Members of the United States National Academy of Sciences
Corresponding Members of the USSR Academy of Sciences
Corresponding Members of the Russian Academy of Sciences
Members of the French Academy of Sciences
Winners of the Max Planck Medal
Lorentz Medal winners
Living people
1945 births
Scientists from Moscow
Russian activists against the 2022 Russian invasion of Ukraine
Russian string theorists